Dargah or Darageh or Dargeh or Dergah, also rendered as Darkeh and Derkah, may refer to:
 Dargah, Astaneh-ye Ashrafiyeh, Gilan Province (درگاه - Dargāh)
 Dargah, Rudsar, Gilan Province (درگاه - Dargāh)
 Dargah, Hormozgan (درگاه - Dargāh)
 Darageh, Malekshahi, Ilam Province
 Dargeh, Dalahu, Kermanshah Province (درگه - Dargeh)
 Dargah, Gilan-e Gharb, Kermanshah Province (درگه - Dargah)
 Dergah, Ravansar, Kermanshah Province (درگه - Dergah)
 Dargeh-ye Cheshmeh Said, Kermanshah Province
 Dargeh-ye Gholam Ali, Kermanshah Province
 Dargeh-ye Khalifeh Qoli, Kermanshah Province
 Darageh-ye Molla Ali Karam, Kermanshah Province
 Dargah-e Sheykhan (disambiguation), places in Kurdistan Province
 Dargah-e Soleyman, Kurdistan Province
 Dergah, West Azerbaijan
 Darageh-ye Oros Khan, West Azerbaijan Province
 Darageh-ye Lotfollah, West Azerbaijan Province

See also
 Darakeh (disambiguation)